The Old Camden Post Office is a former post office building at 133 Washington Street SW in Camden, Arkansas.  The two story Romanesque Revival structure was built in 1895, and is one of the city's finest brick buildings.  It was described, shortly after its construction, as the "finest building between Little Rock and Texarkana".  It originally housed the post office on the ground floor and the Federal Land Office on the second floor.

The building was listed on the National Register of Historic Places in 1977.

See also 

National Register of Historic Places listings in Ouachita County, Arkansas
List of United States post offices

References 

Post office buildings on the National Register of Historic Places in Arkansas
Romanesque Revival architecture in Arkansas
Government buildings completed in 1895
Buildings and structures in Camden, Arkansas
National Register of Historic Places in Ouachita County, Arkansas
1895 establishments in Arkansas